Montgomery Area High School is a diminutive public high school in Montgomery, Lycoming County, Pennsylvania. It is the sole high school operated by the Montgomery Area School District. Montgomery Area High School serves: the borough of Montgomery as well as Clinton Township, Brady Township, and Washington Township in Lycoming County. The Montgomery Area School Board converted the high school to a joint junior and senior high school for 2014–15, due to low enrollment.

In 2015, enrollment was reported as 364 pupils in 7th through 12th grades. The school employed 23 teachers.

Extracurriculars
The Montgomery Area School District offers a wide variety of clubs, activities and an extensive sports program. Several sports are offered in cooperation with the Muncy School District.

Sports
The district funds:

Varsity Boys
Baseball - A
Basketball- A
Football - A
Golf - AA
Soccer - A
Tennis - AA
Track and field - AA
 Wrestling  - AA

Varsity Girls
Basketball - A
Golf - AA
Soccer - A
Softball - A
Tennis - AA
Track and field - AA

Junior high school

Boys
Basketball
Football
Wrestling 

Girls
Basketball

According to PIAA directory July 2016

References

Public high schools in Pennsylvania
Susquehanna Valley
Schools in Lycoming County, Pennsylvania